Suffer the Children may refer to:

Suffer the Children (EP), a 1990 EP by Napalm Death
"Suffer the Children" (song), a 1981 single by Tears for Fears
"Suffer the Children" (The 4400), an episode of the TV series The 4400
Suffer the Children (novel), a 1977 horror novel by John Saul

See also
Suffer Little Children